Fandom (formerly known as Wikicities before 2007 and later Wikia before 2019) is a wiki hosting service that hosts wikis mainly on entertainment topics (i.e. video games, TV series, movies, entertainers, etc.). It is owned by the privately held Fandom, Inc. (formerly known as Wikia, Inc. until 2019), a for-profit Delaware company founded in October 2004 by Jimmy Wales (co-founder of Wikipedia) and Angela Beesley. Fandom was acquired in 2018 by TPG Inc. and Jon Miller through Integrated Media Co.

Fandom uses MediaWiki, the open-source wiki software used by Wikipedia. Fandom, Inc. derives its income from advertising and sold content, publishing most user-provided text under copyleft licenses. The company also runs the associated Fandom editorial project, offering pop-culture and gaming news. Fandom wikis are hosted under the domain fandom.com, but some, especially those that focus on subjects other than media franchises, were hosted under wikia.org until November 2021.

History

2004–2009: Early days and growth 
Fandom was launched on October 18, 2004, at 23:50:49 (UTC) under the name Wikicities (which invited comparisons to Yahoo's GeoCities), by Jimmy Wales and Angela Beesley Starling—respectively chairman emeritus and advisory board member of the Wikimedia Foundation. The name of the project was changed to Wikia on March 27, 2006. In the month before the move, Wikia announced a US$4 million venture capital investment from Bessemer Venture Partners and First Round Capital. Nine months later, Amazon.com invested $10 million in Series B funding.

By September 2006, Wikia had approximately 1,500 wikis in 48 languages. Over time, Wikia has incorporated formerly independent wikis such as LyricWiki, Nukapedia, Uncyclopedia, and WoWWiki. Gil Penchina described Wikia early on as "the rest of the library and magazine rack" to Wikipedia's encyclopedia. The material has also been described as informal, and often bordering on entertainment, allowing the importing of maps, YouTube videos, and other non-traditional wiki material.

2010–2015: New management
By 2010, wikis could be created in 188 different languages. In October 2011, Craig Palmer, the former CEO of Gracenote, replaced Penchina as CEO. In February 2012, co-founder Beesley Starling left Wikia to launch a startup called ChalkDrop.com. At the end of November 2012, Wikia raised $10.8 million in Series C funding from Institutional Venture Partners and previous investors Bessemer Ventures Partners and Amazon.com. Another $15 million was raised in August 2014 for Series D funding, with investors Digital Garage, Amazon, Bessemer Venture Partners, and Institutional Venture Partners. The total raised at this point was $39.8 million.

On March 4, 2015, Wikia appointed Walker Jacobs, former executive vice-president of Turner Broadcasting System, to the new position of chief operating officer. In December 2015, Wikia launched the Fan Contributor Program.

2016–2018: Fandom brand

On January 25, 2016, Wikia launched a new entertainment news site named Fandom.

On October 4, 2016, Wikia.com was renamed "Fandom powered by Wikia", to better associate itself with the Fandom website. Wikia, Inc. remained under its then-current name, and the homepage of Wikia.com was moved to wikia.com/fandom.

In December 2016, Wikia appointed Dorth Raphaely, former general manager of Bleacher Report, as chief content officer.

2018–present: Further acquisitions and inclusivity
In February 2018, former AOL CEO Jon Miller, backed by private equity firm TPG Capital, acquired Fandom. Miller was named co-chairman of Wikia, Inc., alongside Jimmy Wales, and TPG Capital director Andrew Doyle assumed the role of interim CEO.

In July 2018, Fandom purchased Screen Junkies from Defy Media, and in December of that year, they had acquired the media assets of Curse LLC, including wiki services Gamepedia, D&D Beyond, Futhead, Muthead, and Straw Poll.

In February 2019, former StubHub CEO Perkins Miller took over as CEO, and Wikia fully changed its domain name to fandom.com. Various wikis had been tested with the new domain during 2018, with some wikis that focused on "more serious topics" having their domains changed to wikia.org instead.

In June 2019, Fandom began an effort to rewrite its core platform, which was written based on MediaWiki version 1.19, to base it on a newer version of the software. On March 11, 2020, Fandom released the Unified Community Platform (UCP), based on MediaWiki 1.33, for newly created wikis.

In November 2020, Fandom began to migrate Gamepedia wikis to a fandom.com domain as part of their search engine optimization strategy, with migrations continuing into 2021.

In February 2021, Fandom acquired Focus Multimedia, the retailer behind Fanatical, an e-commerce platform that sells digital games, ebooks and other products related to gaming.

In late March 2021, Fandom updated its terms of use policy to prohibit deadnaming transgender individuals across their websites. This policy was in response to a referendum on the Star Wars wiki Wookieepedia to ban deadnaming, which triggered a debate around an article about the non-binary artist Robin Pronovost. In response to the deadnaming controversy, Fandom also introduced new LGBT guidelines across its websites in late June 2021 which include links to queer-inclusive and trans support resources.

In June 2021, Fandom began to roll out FandomDesktop, a redesigned theme for desktop devices, with plans to retire its legacy Oasis and Hydra skins once the rollout was complete. Two months later on August 3, Fandom rolled out a new look, new colors, new logo, and introduced a new tagline, "For the love of fans."

In late November/early December 2021, all remaining wikis under the wikia.org domain migrated to the fandom.com domain.

On October 3, 2022, Fandom acquired GameSpot, Metacritic, TV Guide, GameFAQs, Giant Bomb, Cord Cutters News, and Comic Vine from Red Ventures.

Services and features

Present

Wikis 
Fandom communities consist of online encyclopedias, each one specializing in a particular subject. Although Fandom allows almost anything to be the main focus of a wiki, the most common interest of its users is in popular fiction franchises of films, TV shows, games, books, and other media, partially attributable to the limitation of such detailed information under Wikipedia's notability policies. This contributed to the service being renamed to Fandom.

The main purpose of articles in a Fandom community is to cover information and discussion on a particular topic in a much greater and more comprehensive detail level than what can be found on Wikipedia articles. For example, Spiteful Crow, an enemy character in EarthBound, may have its own article on the EarthBound Fandom, whereas the character may not be considered notable enough for a Wikipedia page. Also, the writing style is mostly directed to those familiar with specific vocabulary and terminology rather than to the lay and general public of Wikipedia; the Harry Potter wiki, for example, is written from the perspective of everything in the franchise universe being real, thus the article about the character Ronald Weasley starts by describing the subject as "a pure-blood wizard, the sixth and youngest son of Arthur and Molly Weasley" instead of "a fictional character in the Harry Potter series".

Other examples of content that is generally considered beyond the scope of information of Wikipedia articles includes Fandom information about video games and related video game topics, detailed instructions, gameplay details, plot details, and so forth. Gameplay concepts can also have their own articles. Fandom also allows wikis to have a point of view, rather than the neutral POV that is required by Wikipedia (although NPOV is a local policy on many Fandom communities).

The image policies of Fandom communities tend to be more lenient than those of Wikimedia Foundation projects, allowing articles with much more illustration. Fandom requires all user text content to be published under a free license; most use the Creative Commons Attribution-ShareAlike license, although a few wikis use a licence with a noncommercial clause (for instance Memory Alpha, Uncyclopedia and others) and some use the GNU Free Documentation License. Fandom's terms of use forbid hate speech, libel, pornography, or copyright infringement. Other material is allowed, as long as the added material does not duplicate existing wikis.

Wikis are also not owned by their founders, nor does the founder's opinion carry more weight in disagreements than any other user's opinion. Consensus and cooperation are the primary means for organizing a community on Fandom. However, Fandom may take decisions affecting the community even if there is no consensus at all.

Technology 
 Fandom uses a heavily modified version of MediaWiki software, based on the version 1.37.6 of MediaWiki. It has more than 200 extensions installed, most of them created by their staff of developers, to add social features like blogs, chat, badges, forums, and multimedia, but also remove features like advanced user options or skins. The personal choice of using the Monobook skin instead of the default custom skin was removed on May 25, 2018, alluding GDPR compliance.

In August 2016, Fandom announced it would switch to a service-oriented architecture. It has also removed many custom extensions and functionality for specific wiki, has created certain features to fill those needs.

Entertainment news 
In 2016, Wikia launched Fandom, an online entertainment media website. The program utilizes volunteer contributors called "Fandom Contributors" to produce articles, working alongside an editorial team employed by Wikia. In contrast to the blogging feature of individual wiki communities, Fandom focuses on pop culture and fan topics such as video games, movies, and television shows. The project features fan opinions, interviews with property creators, reviews, and how-to guides. Fandom also includes videos and specific news coverage sponsored or paid for by a property creator to promote their property.

In the same year, it was also announced that the entire Wikia platform would be rebranded under the Fandom name on October 4, 2016. A leak from Fandom's Community Council was posted to Reddit's /r/Wikia subreddit in August 2018, confirming that Fandom would be migrating all wikis from the wikia.com domain, to fandom.com in early 2019, as part of a push for greater adoption of Fandom's wiki-specific applications on both iOS and Android's app ecosystems. The post was later deleted.

Wiki partnerships 
Fandom has created several official partnerships to create wikis, vetted by the corporation as being the "official" encyclopedia or wiki of a property. In 2012, Fandom partnered with Sony Online Entertainment to create the first "Wikia Official Community" for PlanetSide 2, with the game's wiki slated to receive exclusive content and support. In 2014, Fandom partnered with Roddenberry Enterprises to create the Trek Initiative, a Fandom hosted wiki community site that features video interviews, promotions, and other material about Star Trek to celebrate its 50th anniversary. Fandom made similar partnerships with 2K Games during the launch of Civilization: Beyond Earth and Warner Bros Interactive for Shadow of Mordor. Fandom also has partnerships with Lionsgate Media to promote Starz and Film franchises through wiki content, fandom articles, and advertisements.

Questions and answers site 
In January 2009, the company created a question and answer website named "Wikianswers", not to be confused with the preexisting WikiAnswers. In March 2010, Fandom re-launched "Answers from Wikia", where users could create topic-specialized knowledge market wikis based upon Fandom's own Wikianswers subdomain.

Esports 
In 2021 the United States Navy hired Fandom to manage and promote esports tournaments and streams on Twitch.

Past services

OpenServing 
OpenServing was a short-lived Web publishing project owned by Fandom, founded on December 12, 2006, and abandoned, unannounced, in January 2008. Like Fandom, OpenServing was to offer free wiki hosting, but it would differ in that each wiki's founder would retain any revenue gained from advertising on the site. OpenServing used a modified version of the Wikimedia Foundation's MediaWiki software created by ArmchairGM, but was intended to branch out to other open source packages.

According to Fandom co-founder and chairman Jimmy Wales, the OpenServing site received several thousand applications in January 2007. However, after a year, no sites had been launched under the OpenServing banner.

Armchair GM 
ArmchairGM was a sports forum and wiki site created by Aaron Wright, Dan Lewis, Robert Lefkowitz and developer David Pean. Launched in early 2006, the site was initially US-based, but sought to improve its links to sports associated with Britain over its first year. Its MediaWiki-based software included a Digg-style article-voting mechanism, blog-like comment forms with "thumbs up/down" user feedback, and the ability to write multiple types of posts (news, opinions, or "locker room" discussion entries).

In late 2006, the site was bought by Fandom for $2 million. After the purchase was made, the former owners applied ArmchairGM's architecture to other Fandom sites. However, Wikia had "dropped support" for the custom software innovations by ArmchairGM by January 2010. From September 2010 to February 2011, Fandom absorbed ArmchairGM's encyclopedia articles and blanked all of its old blog entries, effectively discontinuing ArmchairGM in its original form.

The software powering ArmchairGM was incrementally open-sourced starting in February 2008 with the public release of the SocialProfile MediaWiki extension. This process was complete by August 2011, when the original ArmchairGM codebase (internally codenamed wikia-ny) was released in full. Since 2008 the ArmchairGM innovations, nicknamed "social tools", have been developed by volunteer developers of the MediaWiki community and they are available under the GNU General Public License, version 2 or later, which is a free and open source software license. The source code is hosted on the Wikimedia Foundation's web servers and mirrored to the popular source code hosting platform GitHub.

Search engines 
Wikia, Inc. initially proposed creating a copyleft search engine; the software (but not the site) was named "Wikiasari" by a November 2004 naming contest. The proposal became inactive in 2005. The "public alpha" of the Wikia Search web search engine was launched on January 7, 2008, from the USSHC underground data center. This roll-out version of the search interface was roundly panned by reviewers in technology media.
The project was ended in March 2009. Late in 2009, a new search engine was established to index and display results from all sites hosted on Fandom.

Controversies

Advertising controversies 
Fandom communities have complained of inappropriate advertisements, or advertising in the body text area. There is no easy way for individual communities to switch to conventional paid hosting, as Fandom usually owns the relevant domain names. When a community leaves Fandom for new hosting, the company typically continues to operate the abandoned wiki using its original name and content for advertising revenue, adversely affecting the new wiki's search rankings.

Relationship with Wikipedia 
In the 2000s, Fandom (as Wikia) was accused of unduly profiting from a perceived association with Wikipedia. Although Fandom has been referred to in the media as "the commercial counterpart to the non-profit Wikipedia", Wikimedia and Fandom staff call this description inaccurate.

In 2006, the Wikimedia Foundation shared hosting and bandwidth costs with Fandom, and received some donated office space from Fandom during the fiscal year ending June 30, 2006. At the end of the fiscal year 2007, Fandom owed the foundation $6,000. In June 2007, two members of the foundation's board of directors also served as employees, officers, or directors of Fandom. In January 2009, Fandom subleased two conference rooms to the Wikimedia Foundation for the Wikipedia Usability Initiative. According to a 2009 email by Erik Möller, deputy director of the Wikimedia Foundation:
We obtained about a dozen bids... We used averaging as a way to arrive at a fair market rate to neither advantage nor disadvantage Wikia when suggesting a rate. The averaging also resulted in a rate that was roughly equivalent to the most comparable space in the running.

Fandom, Inc. 

The overall parent company, Fandom, Inc., is headquartered at the Hallidie Building on 130 Sutter Street in San Francisco, California. The company was incorporated in Florida in December 2004 and re-incorporated in Delaware as Wikia, Inc. on January 10, 2006.

Fandom has technical staff in the US, but also has an office in Poznań, Poland, where the primary engineering functions are performed.

Fandom derives income from advertising. The company initially used Google AdSense but moved on to Federated Media before bringing ad management in-house. Alongside Fandom's in-house advertising, they continue to use AdSense as well as Amazon Ads and several other third-party advertising services. Fandom also gains income from various partnerships oriented around various sweepstake sponsorships on related wikis.

Fandom has several other offices. International operations are based in Germany, and Asian operations and sales are conducted in Tokyo. Other sales offices are located in Chicago, Latin America, Los Angeles (marketing programming and content), New York City, and London.

See also 
 Comparison of wiki hosting services

Notes

References

External links 

 

 
Free-content websites
MediaWiki websites
Wiki farms
American companies established in 2004
Internet properties established in 2004
Online publishing companies of the United States
Privately held companies based in California
Knowledge markets
South of Market, San Francisco
Wikis
2004 establishments in California
Jimmy Wales
TPG Capital companies